Club Deportivo San Bernardo Unido is a Chilean football club based in San Bernardo. They currently play at the fifth level of Chilean football, the Tercera División B.

The club was founded on October 25, 2011 and participated for five years in Tercera División B of Chile.

Its traditional rival is Lautaro de Buin. They contest the Clásico de la Provincia de Maipo.

History 
It was founded on October 25, 2011, as Club Deportivo San Bernardo Unido, under the aegis of the San Bernardo Football Association and the municipality.

In 2012, he sent a nomination to the National Soccer Association of Chile, which is accepted, joining that same year to the tournament of Fourth Division of Chile, as it was known at that time. In that tournament, the San Bernardo Unido Sports Club makes a remarkable campaign, which highlights the paths won by Deportes Cerro Navia by 9 to 0 and 7 to 0, which would be awarded his group with 36 points, qualifying to the final quadrangular. In the final instance of this championship was to face Defensor Casablanca, Pudahuel Barrancas, Ferroviarios, to obtain one of the quotas for direct promotion to the Third Division of Chile, unfortunately the club that had received 3 bonus points for leaving first in their group I finish last with 6 points.

In 2013, the club is located in the Metropolitan Group of the Transition Tournament, where he had a lean performance where he finished last of the group with 6 points. In that same year he played in the Clausura Tournament, in which San Bernardo Unido finished in fifth place with 17 points, where Mairon Lobos stands out, who finished seventh in the Top 10 scorers with 6 goals.

For 2014, San Bernardo Unido stayed in the South Zone, where the clashes with Deportes Provincial Osorno stand out, in which I finish last with 10 points, having to play the Liguilla de Permanencia. In that instance, the end was dramatic, in which San Bernardo Unido arrived at the bottom of the table to the last confrontation, where he faced in the Municipal Stadium of San Bernardo Juventud Puente Alto, with whom he disputed the permanence, the party ended 6 to 2, in favor of San Bernardo Unido, that result made it difficult for him to return to his Association of Origin. I finish finally second of that phase with 7 points and determining the descent of Juventud Puente Alto, for that season.

In 2015, San Bernardo Unido debuted in a new tournament organized by the National Football Association of Chile, which was named as Absolute Cup, where it was made up of Real San Joaquín, Ferro Estación Lampa and Pudahuel Barrancas, ending with 0 points in this group. The club returned to have a bad campaign in the League, where it had many complications and bad results, except that it gave the surprise with a victory in Los Lirios in front of Deportes Tocopilla in which it was leader and undefeated in that tournament, but finally it came to the last date I face to Enfoque de Rancagua, where for the aspirations of San Bernardo Unido I achieve the triumph by 1 to 0 of quality of visit, finishing eighth with 17 units.

In 2016, San Bernardo Unido began its participation in the second edition of the Absolute Cup, where he stayed with Gasparín FC, Provincial Talagante, Pirque Sports and Luis Matte Larraín, finishing with 3 points in his group. In the second half of the year he had a great performance in the tournament, starting with a 1 to 0 victory at Enfoque de Rancagua, giving the blow to defeat and take the undefeated Municipal Santiago by 2 to 0 in local condition, the club had an intense fight in the championship, where I achieve important results, defeating Buenos Aires de Parral by 4 to 1, and Deportes Tomé by 3 to 0, reaching the last date with options to access the next round, in which I faced Sports Pirque, duel that would end 2 to 1 in favor of the picture that represents the working-class neighborhood of Santiago de Chile, result that would not serve as Sports Tomé managed to defeat Deportivo La Granja by 5 to 3, and after equaling 46 points both casts, the table of the eighth region agreed by goal difference (+23 for Sports Tome and +11 for San Bernardo Unido).

In 2017, San Bernardo Unido began its participation with several victories, then had a negative streak, which made it be the protagonist of the bottom of the table, finishing penultimate with 17 points, only beating Pirque Sports, who would descend, in the Center Group.

Coach 
  José Miguel González (2012-2013)
  Juan Pablo Bravo (2013-2014)
  Miguel Ángel Castillo (2015-2017)
  José Miguel González (2018)
  Nelson Cossio (2018)
  Francisco Carillo (2019)
  Raúl Puelle (2022-)

Seasons 
 8 seasons in Tercera División B (2012–2019)
 1 seasons in Copa Chile (2022)

Shield

Players 

|- style="background:#FFF; color:#06B; text-align:center; font-weight:bold;"
|colspan=4| Goalkeeper

|- style="background:#FFF; color:#06B; text-align:center; font-weight:bold;"
|colspan=4| Defender

|- style="background:#FFF; color:#06B; text-align:center; font-weight:bold;"
|colspan=4| Midfielder

|- style="background:#FFF; color:#06B; text-align:center; font-weight:bold;"
|colspan=4| Forward

Performance

League

Cup

Records 
Record Tercera División B victory
San Bernardo Unido 9:0 Deportes Cerro Navia
Record Tercera División B defeat
Ferroviarios 11:2 San Bernardo Unido

Uniform

Home

Away

Sponsors

References 
 Tercera Division (ANFA)  (per 5 August 2017).

External links 
  San Bernardo Unido on Facebook

2011 establishments in Chile
Association football clubs established in 2011
Football clubs in Chile